Aqilabad (also Romanized as ‘Aqīlābād; also known as Aghil Abad) is a village in Sedeh Rural District, in the Central District of Arak County, Markazi Province, Iran. At the 2006 census, its population was 1,571, in 441 families.

References 

Populated places in Arak County